Lunachicks are an American punk rock band from New York City. The band formed in 1987 and had been on hiatus since 2000, with the band reuniting in 2019.  The band cited influences including the Ramones, Kiss, and the MC5.

Biography 
Theo Kogan, Gina Volpe, and Sydney "Squid" Silver were students at New York City's Fiorello H. LaGuardia High School of Music & Art and Performing Arts when they decided to form a band. Sindi Benezra, an acquaintance of Silver, was asked to join shortly after. They rehearsed and wrote material in Gina's bedroom for about a year. Their first composition, the lengthy "Theme Song", was about killing Kogan's and Silver's English teacher. The band played their first show in 1988 with Theo's then-boyfriend Mike on the drums.

Kim Gordon and Thurston Moore of Sonic Youth were amongst the audience for one of their early performances. Gordon and Moore were impressed with the band and sent a demo tape to Paul Smith in England, which landed them a deal on Smith's label Blast First. With drummer Becky Wreck (Susan Rebecca Lloyd) on board they released a self-titled four-song EP in 1989, and the album Babysitters on Acid, both produced by Wharton Tiers. The record was only available in Europe until it was re-released on Go-Kart Records in 2001. The band later expressed their strong dislike for the album's production, and the fact that they did not earn any money from Blast First. The band went on to tour with the Dictators in 1991.

1992 saw the release of their second album, Binge & Purge. Around this time drummer Becky Wreck gained cult popularity for a TV appearance on Howard Stern's Lesbian Dating Game. She left the band some time later and was briefly replaced by Beastie Boys and Luscious Jackson drummer Kate Schellenbach, before Chip English joined. During their first visit to Japan, a six-song EP entitled Sushi A La Mode, featuring a cover of Boston's "More Than a Feeling", was recorded and released in Japan in the fall of 1993.

Lunachicks were signed to New York-based label Go Kart Records, on which they released 1995's Jerk of All Trades. The follow-up, 1997's Pretty Ugly, produced by Ryan Greene and Fat Mike of NOFX, features their most well-known song "Don't Want You", which was promoted with a video. Guitarist Sindi then left the band, after which the band stayed a four-piece. They released their first live album Drop Dead Live in 1998, and then their final album to date, Luxury Problem. By this time, the group had a busy touring schedule, headlining clubs in the United States, Europe, the U.K., and Japan, while opening for the likes of the Ramones, the Buzzcocks, No Doubt, the Go-Go's, Rancid, and NOFX, as well as appearing on the Vans Warped Tour.

Lunachicks joined the Warped Tour in 1999, one of only three female acts along with the Donnas and Bif Naked, and again in 2000. Chip English left the band in the fall of 1999 and was replaced by then 18-year-old Helen Destroy (now known as Gus Morgan), who stayed with the band until it went inactive in the summer of 2001. The band never officially disbanded, but had been inactive since then, with the exception of two reunion shows in 2002 and 2004.

Whilst being the front runner for the Lunachicks, Theo Kogan also worked on the side as a model, per request by her friends in the fashion industry. She modeled for Calvin Klein, which ended up being a controversial campaign said to promote "drug use", and Burberry. In an interview with Jon Stewart, Kogan noted that music would always come before modeling and that modeling would always be a side job.

In 2020, the band announced on their official website that they are working on a book, Fallopian Rhapsody, which was published in 2021 by Hachette Books.

In 2021, the band played two shows at Punk Rock Bowling in Las Vegas. It was their first live performances in 17 years.

Fallopian Rhapsody (memoir) 
On September 1, 2021, Hachette Books published the Lunachicks' memoir, Fallopian Rhapsody: The Story of the Lunachicks. It was written with co-author Jeanne Fury.

The book received praise from critics and peers:

“Their name alone is a stroke of genius, and bless them for keeping the faith in Rock alive. Now Fallopian Rhapsody confirms the myth, and after I read the book, I lost weight, my hair got thicker, my nails grew strong enough to climb trees, and my sex life soared to unbelievable heights.”―Debbie Harry of Blondie

“This book contains the realest, funniest, most heart-wrenching writing about being in a band I've ever read. The first Lunachicks record, Babysitters on Acid, gave me permission to be my full self as a singer (though NO ONE can touch Theo Kogan’s voice EVER), and now this book has confirmed what I already knew. The Lunachicks, as people, are as hilarious, complicated, and undeniable as their songs.”―Kathleen Hanna of The Julie Ruin, Le Tigre, and Bikini Kill

“As a rebellious New York City teenager deeply involved in the underground music scene, I cannot stress the magnitude and impact the Lunachicks had on not just me, not just female musicians, but the New York City scene as a whole. They were torch bearers for all of us, giving us permission and inspiration to be as wild as we could possibly imagine and just go for it. It was an absolute side-splitting and heartbreaking joy to read all these personal stories and know what was really going on behind all that black eyeliner. Thanks for kicking that door open so the rest of us could run in.”―Jessica Pimentel of Orange Is the New Black

“Was anyone ever as powerful as teen girls in the 1990s NYC? This sexy, funny, totally bonkers band memoir took me right back to that dangerous DIY era in all its filth and freedom. Fallopian Rhapsody is a valuable addition to the literary canons of obnoxious punk rock, TV-raised Generation X, and messy, creative female friendships that last a lifetime.”―Ada Calhoun, author of St. Marks Is Dead and Why We Can’t Sleep

“For me, the Lunachicks embodied the lower east side of the ’90s. Gritty, glammy, over-the-top punk rock and rollers, this was a band that you had to see to believe. Out of the thousands of concerts I’ve seen, the first time I saw the Lunachicks stands out to me as the most ‘What the f**k did I just witness?’ moment of my concert-going life. Fallopian Rhapsody is a must-read for fans of the CBGB-era rock scene that was New York City and brings to life the unique swagger and controlled (or sometimes not so controlled) chaos that was the Lunachicks. Both poignant and hilarious, it’s a book that when finished makes you ponder ‘What the f**k did I just read?’”―Chris Santos, cofounder of Beauty & Essex and judge on Chopped

“Fallopian Rhapsody is a whirlwind ride through untold punk rock history on the wheels of a cross-country tour with the Lunachicks, from illuminated stories on the catastrophic dynamics between bandmates as sisters to the necessary details on the drugs and assholes who attempted to break them. Often told in first person, Fallopian Rhapsody is a tell-all tale on existing fabulously, outside of every potential box. It’s a time capsule that brings light to the sound, action, filth, decadence, and nasty-woman rapture of seminal NYC punks, the Lunachicks.”―Cristy Road Carrera of Next World Tarot, Spit and Passion, Choked Up, and The Homewreckers

"If I was a mother, I would hand this book to my kid and say LEARN! So it’s probably good that I’m not a mother. However I AM a PERSON and I WISH I’d had this book to read when I was a kid to learn how to be a fierce FRIEND, and what really goes into being a courageous, unapologetic ARTIST. Thanks for being the blueprint, Lunachicks!!!"―Justin Vivian Bond

Kirkus Reviews called the book "Trashy rock ’n’ roll fun—a Thunderbird alternative to typical rock-memoir Chardonnay." New Noise said the book is "a frank, deeply honest telling of the Lunachicks’ history, warts and all." The band did numerous interviews after the release of the book, including:
 The band was interviewed by journalist Jenny Eliscu for the official book release event hosted by Powerhouse Arena
Theo was interviewed by Damian Abraham for his podcast Turned Out a Punk
 Squid was interviewed by Lydia Lunch for her podcast The Lydian Spin
 Gina was interviewed by Guitar World magazine
 Vogue featured an in-depth interview with Theo
 Decibel magazine interviewed Theo about the band's relationship to snacking

Film appearances 
Besides being active in music, the band also had a fair share of movie appearances. The first was in a low-budget splatter movie entitled Blue Vengeance (shot in 1989, but not released until 1992). The band also can be seen in the 1990s riot-grrrl documentary, Not Bad For A Girl, as well as Rockstar (produced in 1996, not released commercially until 2004), and High Times' Potluck (2002), both of which featured lead singer Kogan in lead roles. The band also appeared in Terror Firmer, and contributed the song "Say What You Mean" to its soundtrack. Kogan and Silver starred in the movie Hair Burners.

The band has also been involved with movies and music videos in other ways, such as being on soundtracks. In 1997 Kogan danced in the Offspring's video for "I Choose". The movie Boys Don't Cry has their music video for "Don't Want You" playing in the background of a scene. The Olsen twins' movie Getting There has their song "Say What You Mean" on the soundtrack. C.J. Ramone of the Ramones has been seen wearing a Lunachicks shirt several times, most notably in the music video for "Poison Heart".

Reunion 
The Lunachicks reunited for a 20-minute set at CBGB's on April 6, 2002 with Benezra on guitar and English on drums. Another reunion took place at the March for Women's Lives Benefit in Washington, D.C. on April 24, 2004 as a four-piece with English on drums. In November 2019, the Lunachicks announced their first reunion in 15 years which they were set to perform two nights at Webster Hall in April 2020. Both shows are sold out, however they were postponed due to the COVID-19 pandemic and were rescheduled for November 26, 2021 and November 27, 2021.

On September 26, 2021, the band played the main stage of the Punk Rock Bowling festival in Las Vegas, opening for Devo. They also played a sold-out afterparty on Friday, September 24. These shows marked the Lunachicks' first live performances in 17 years.

Other projects 
 Singer Theo Kogan married Toilet Böys guitarist Sean Pierce, with whom she formed the band Theo & the Skyscrapers, who has released two albums to date (2006's self-titled album and 2007's So Many Ways to Die). She occasionally works as a fashion model and actress. She appeared in Bringing Out the Dead as a prostitute, Zoolander as the tattooed woman in Hansel's loft and Tadpole as a woman at the bar. In 2009, Kogan founded the company ARMOUR Beauty, which is dedicated to creating lipglosses that are durable and vegan. The lipgloss is paraben-free, gluten-free and requires no animal testing. Along with establishing her own brand, Kogan also runs a tumblr page dedicated to documenting her makeup artistry, as she now works as a makeup artist full-time.
 Guitarist Gina Volpe formed and fronted her power trio Bantam, which released two records on her own label, Heavy Nose Records. She also wrote the music and lyrics for Homo the Musical, which was written and directed by Lola Rocknrolla. She has composed music scores for several independent films, including Lola Rocknrolla's Nefertitty franchise. In 2017 Gina Volpe teamed up with producer Barb Morrison (Blondie, Franz Ferdinand) and returned to the studio to record Different Animal, her debut solo release a 5-song EP, released download-only on April 21, 2017. A departure from her previous rock-based bands, Different Animal sees Volpe blending analog and electronic elements into a thoroughly modern sound inspired by everything from Santigold to Pink Floyd to TV on the Radio. Volpe also made five videos to be released with each of the songs. She Shreds Magazine calls her new music "a diverse collection of tracks layered with chunky riffs, pop, and dance sounds".
 Bassist Sydney Silver used to work as a tattoo artist, before opening the Roebling Tea Room in 2005, a popular eatery in Williamsburg, Brooklyn. Followed then by restaurants River Styx 2013 and 21 Greenpoint in 2016. In 2017 she founded health food company Doc's Natural, dedicated to organic and "No Junk Guaranteed" packaged foods, as well as established her private practice specializing in business coaching.  
 Becky Wreck was the drummer for the Blare Bitch Project in 2002. She played in the band Dirty Cakes from 2019 to 2021.
 Chip English played drums for Suicide King and 1-900-BOXX.
 Helen Destroy (now Gus Morgan) played drums in the all-female Led Zeppelin tribute band, Lez Zeppelin.

Discography

Albums
Babysitters on Acid (1990) (Blast First)
Binge & Purge (1992) (Safe House)
Jerk of All Trades (1995) (Go Kart Records)
Pretty Ugly (1997) (Go Kart Records)
Drop Dead Live (1998) (Go Kart Records)
Luxury Problem (1999) (Go Kart Records)

Singles and EPs
Lunachicks Double 7" (1989)
"Cookie Monster" / "Complication" 7" (1990)
"C.I.L.L." / "Plugg" 7" (1992)
Apathetic EP (1992)
"F.D.S." / "Light as a Feather" 7" (1993)
Sushi A La Mode EP (1993, Japan only)
"Edgar" CD single (1995, promo)
"Don't Want You" CD single (1997, promo)

Videos
XXX Naked (1999, home video with video clips and interviews)

References

External links
 Official site
 Theo Kogan
 Sydney Silver
 Gina Volpe
 Chip English
 Lunachicks at Go-Kart Records
 Fan site
 Lunachicks album reviews

All-female punk bands
Blast First artists
Musical groups disestablished in 2000
Musical groups established in 1987
Musical groups reestablished in 2019
Pop punk groups from New York (state)
Proto-riot grrrl bands